Oroxyleae is a tribe of trees in the family Bignoniaceae: typically found in Asia.

Genera 
Four genera are currently recognised:
 Hieris Steenis - monotypic Hieris curtisii (Ridl.) Steenis
 Millingtonia L. f. (synonym Nevrilis Raf.) - monotypic
 Nyctocalos Teijsm. & Binn. 
 Nyctocalos brunfelsiiflorum Teijsm. & Binn.
 Nyctocalos cuspidatum (Blume) Miq.
 Nyctocalos pinnatum Steenis
 Nyctocalos shanica R.W.MacGregor & W.W.Sm.
 Oroxylum Vent. (synonyms: Calosanthes Blume & Hippoxylon Raf.) - monotypic

References

External links 
 
 

Bignoniaceae
Asterid tribes